Burley Lagoon is a picturesque  watershed located on the Key Peninsula in both Pierce County, Washington and Kitsap County, Washington. The lagoon is part of the Puget Sound.  Approximately sixty percent of the lagoon (marine waters) is in Pierce County and forty percent in Kitsap County. The percentages in each county are reversed for the watershed uplands. All of the commercial shellfish acreage, which is owned by Western Oyster Company, is in Pierce County. Historically rural, the lagoon is experiencing rapid growth as more people move to the area.

The Purdy Bridge and Purdy Sand Spit Park separate Burley Lagoon from Henderson Bay, Washington.

The unincorporated communities of Burley, Washington and Purdy, Washington rest on the shores of Burley Lagoon.

Environmental Concerns
The Washington State Department of Transportation is currently investigating the possibility of building a controversial bridge over Burley Lagoon.

External links
Washington State Department of Ecology Aerial Photo

References

Lagoons of the United States
Bodies of water of Washington (state)
Bodies of water of Kitsap County, Washington
Bodies of water of Pierce County, Washington